Abdullah Aymaz is a turkish islamic preacher and writer and was born in Kütahya, Turkey in 1949.

Life and achievements

Ayaz moved to Izmir as a teenager and visited the İzmir İmam Hatip high school. He did his higher education at İzmir Yüksek İslam Enstitüsü  and he worked as a teacher in Tire and Izmir. His career as a journalist as well as a writer started in 1988 when he started to work for the Turkish newspaper Zaman.

Turkish Theologian, Journalist, Writer

Abdullah Aymaz was born on 1945, in Emet, Turkey. After studying at the primary school, he moved to Izmir, where he met with Turkish scholar and opinion leader Fethullah Gulen and Hizmet (Service) Movement, to study at religious vocational high school and Islamic Institute. During his time in high school, he wrote up articles for Gurbet magazine. He served as teacher and manager of educational foundations in several places of Izmir. In 1979, his religious and educational articles began to be published in Sızıntı magazine, which is the very first publication of Hizmet Movement. As of 1988, his journalism career commenced in Zaman newspaper, in which he also served as editor-in-chief until 1992. As writer, he published more than 50 books under the pen names of Huseyin Bayram, Ismail Yediler and Safvet Senih. Currently, his articles are still published in Zaman Europe. 
Aymaz is one of the first names that come to mind when one thinks of Hizmet Movement. Because he spent most of his time with Fethullah Gülen in his youth and after, he internalizes the vision of Gülen. Considering the very beginning of Hizmet Movement, he has a very important role in the formation of movement’s discourse. 19 In March 1997, he conveyed Fethullah Gülen's letter to Pope John Paul II. Since the days in Izmir, where Gülen's outstanding discourse began to crystallize, Abdullah Aymaz has become an integral part of him and the movement.

 Sadık Yar
 Meryem Gibi
 Sen Yusuf Musun?
 Yusuflar'a
 Günümüz Yusuflarına
 Evrensel Dil
 Işığın Düştüğü Yerler
 Kardelenlerimiz
 Şifa Çiçekleri
 Diyalog Adımları
 Çitlembik 1 /Nükteler
 Çitlembik-2 /Nükteler
 Çitlembik-3 / Su Gibi Aziz
 Çitlembik-4 / Şahit Olmaya Geldik Sahip Olmaya Geldik
 Çitlembik-5 / Dua Hazinesi
 Çitlembik-6 / Anadolu'nun En Büyük Sadakası
 Yaratılış ve Darwinizm
 Lemaat
 Münazarat
 Sünuhat
 Barla Lahikası Üzerine
 Ayetül Kübra Üzerine
 Kastamonu Lahikası Üzerine
 Emirdağ Lahikası Üzerine-1
 Emirdağ Lahikası Üzerine-2
 Muhakemat Üzerine Sadeleştirme ve Açıklama
 Hutbe-i Şamiye Üzerine Sadeleştirme ve Açıklama
 Cihetsiz Sesler (Göze Takılanlar – 1)
 Bakıp Göremediklerimiz (Göze Takılanlar – 2)
 Sözün Çağrısı (Göze Takılanlar −3)
 Söz Saati (Göze Takılanlar – 4)
 Göze Takılanlar / Makaleler ve Gezi Notları 1-2-3-4

His work using his pen name: Hüseyin Bayram
 Zeka Tomurcuklarına Damlalar

His work using his pen name: Safvet Senih
 Dışa Yansıyan İç Dünyamız (1–2)
 Duyduklarım Gördüklerim
 Hatıralar Işığında
 Kelimeler Armonisi
 Öze İşleyen Söz
 Hücre Devleti
 Hikmet
 Gaybın Haberleri
 Peygamberler
 Kıssa-i Musa
 Hızır ve Dostları
 Hızıri Adımlar / Uzakları Yakın Eylemek
 Şüpheler Üzerine
 İlim Açısından Kader
 Yaratılış ve Kader
 Ölüm ve Diriliş
 Ruhlar ve Ötesi
 Kur'an ve İlimler
 Kur'an da Edebi Veche
 Miraç Şehsuvarı
 Mercan Mağaraları
 Hadislerin Işığında Hadiseler
 Hazinelerin Anahtarı Besmele
 İbadetin Getirdikleri
 Zilzal ve Dua / Yüzyılın Felaketi Depreme Farklı Bir Bakış

References

1949 births
20th-century novelists
21st-century novelists
Turkish writers
Turkish journalists
People from Kütahya
Living people
Imam Hatip school alumni
Zaman (newspaper) people